Golden duck may refer to:

 Golden duck (cricket), players who are dismissed by the first ball they face
 Golden Duck Award for Excellence in Children's Science Fiction Literature
 Złota Kaczka (Polish for golden duck), a Polish film award

See also
 Gold Duck (Złota kaczka), a legendary creature from Warsaw's urban legends